Scott Allen Dunn (born May 23, 1978) is a former Major League Baseball pitcher. After graduating from Winston Churchill High School in San Antonio, he attended the University of Texas at Austin. After college, he was drafted by the Cincinnati Reds.

He pitched in the Oakland Athletics minor league system in 2007, following the season, Dunn retired from professional baseball.

In August , Dunn pitched a perfect game for the Clinton LumberKings, the fifth such achievement in Midwest League history.

References

External links

1978 births
Living people
Anaheim Angels players
Tampa Bay Devil Rays players
Baseball players from San Antonio
Major League Baseball pitchers
Texas Longhorns baseball players
Billings Mustangs players
Clinton LumberKings players
Chattanooga Lookouts players
Mudville Nine players
Birmingham Barons players
Salt Lake Stingers players
Arkansas Travelers players
Durham Bulls players
Arizona League Athletics players
Anchorage Glacier Pilots players